NRP Almirante Gago Coutinho (A523) is a ship of the Portuguese Navy' Dom Carlos I-class survey vessels (ex-US  adapted in Portugal for the execution of hydrography and oceanography surveys). Before transfer to the Portuguese Navy, Almirante Gago Coutinho was formerly USNS Assurance (T-AGOS-5) of the United States Navy.

Design
The s were succeeded by the longer . It was powered by a diesel-electric system of four Caterpillar D-398 diesel-powered generators and two General Electric  electric motors. This produced a total of  that drove two shafts. It had a gross register tonnage of 1,584 tons and a deadweight tonnage of 786 tons.

They were built to be fitted with the Surveillance Towed Array Sensor System (SURTASS) system. The ship had an endurance of thirty days. Its complement was between thirty-two and forty-seven. Its hull design was similar to that of the s.

History
USNS Assurance was a Stalwart-class modified tactical auxiliary general ocean surveillance ship of the United States Navy. Stalwart-class ships were originally designed to collect underwater acoustical data in support of Cold War anti-submarine warfare operations in the 1980s.

In 1999, ex-USNS Assurance was transferred to Portugal and is now NRP Almirante Gago Coutinho survey ship.

References

External links

NavSource
 

Stalwart-class ocean surveillance ships
Cold War auxiliary ships of the United States
Ships built in Washington (state)
1985 ships
Ships transferred from the United States Navy to the Portuguese Navy